Logan (Scottish Gaelic: An Lagan) is a village in East Ayrshire, southwest Scotland.

Logan is served by a regular daytime bus service to Cumnock operated by Shuttle buses Ltd of Kilwinnig. The nearest train station is Auchinleck.

References

External links

Villages in East Ayrshire